Steven Arthur Hickham Jr. (born Corpus Christi, Texas September 21, 1989) is an American racing driver.

Early years
Hickham grew up on a ranch just outside Corpus Christi. He won 3rd place in bull riding at The Houston Livestock Show & Rodeo in 2005. At the start of his sophomore year in high school, Hickham moved to Port Aransas, Texas, to focus more on his career in racing.

Career
On March 17, 2006, at the first round of the Star Pro Formula Mazda race in Sebring, Florida, Hickham had his first race start as a professional race driver. He finished 12th, having run in the top five for part of the race.  He placed 18th in the Labor Day Grand Prix of Motorsport on September 2, 2006. Hickham ultimately finished 25th in points, with a best finish of 10th at Road America in his first season. He won the Championship in the 2006 SWFM Pro Car Series. Hickham made a showing at the 2007 SCCA Runoffs, only to suffer from mishaps in turn one of the first lap. The following weekend, he was back in the pro Mazda at Laguna Seca, finishing 8th behind his teammate Marco DiLeo. Hickham then made a move from open wheel racing to full body cars.

In the 2008 SCC Grand Am / Grand Sport series, Hickham's final position was 115th.

Hickham and his co-driver, his father, continue to compete with each other as a father/son race team.

References

External links 
 photos at motorsport.com

1989 births
Living people
American racing drivers
People from Corpus Christi, Texas
People from Port Aransas, Texas